The montane frog is a frog that is endemic to the hills of central Sri Lanka.

Montane frog may also refer to:

 Montane brown frog, a frog endemic to Japan
 Montane marsh frog, a frog endemic to Western Cape, South Africa
 Montane reed frog, a frog native to Kenya
 Montane robber frog, a frog native to Guatemala and southern Mexico
 Montane sheep frog, a frog found in El Salvador, Guatemala, Honduras, and Mexico

Animal common name disambiguation pages